This is a list of magazines in the USA that have online archives. This is not to be confused with webzines which do not print a hardcopy edition and instead provide it online only, typically via the World Wide Web.

U.S. magazines with online archives
 Biblical Archaeology Review (1975- )
 The Caribbean Pioneer
 The Christadelphian Tidings of the Kingdom of God
 GEMC GEORGIA Magazine (formerly RURAL GEORGIA Magazine) (1945- )
  (1990- )
 Lookinside Magazine (1923- )
 Tampa Bay Parenting Magazine (2008- )
 Time (1923- ) (pay)

Cornell archive
 Cornell magazine archive (free)
 The American Missionary (1878 - 1901)
 The American Whig Review (1845 - 1852)
 The Atlantic Monthly (1857 - 1901)
 The Bay State Monthly (1884 - 1886)
 The Century (1881 - 1899)
 The Continental Monthly (1862 - 1864)
 The Galaxy (1866 - 1878)
 Harper's New Monthly Magazine (1850 - 1899)
 The International Monthly Magazine (1850 - 1852)
 The Living Age (1844 - 1900)
 Manufacturer and Builder (1869 - 1894)
 The New England Magazine (1886 - 1900)
 The New-England Magazine (1831 - 1835)
 New Englander (1843 - 1892)
 The North American Review (1815 - 1900)
 The Old Guard (1863 - 1867)
 Punchinello (1870)
 Putnam's Monthly (1853 - 1870)
 Scientific American (1846 - 1869)
 Scribner's Magazine (1887 - 1896)
 Scribner's Monthly (1870 - 1881)
 The United States Democratic Review (1837 - 1859)

See also
 Magazine
 Media of the United States

List of United States magazines with online archives
 Online archives